Prometopiops is a genus of parasitic flies in the family Tachinidae.

Species
Ptesiomyia alacris (Meigen, 1824)
Ptesiomyia longicornis Kugler, 1980
Ptesiomyia microstoma Brauer & von Bergenstamm, 1893

References

Taxa named by Friedrich Moritz Brauer
Taxa named by Julius von Bergenstamm
Diptera of Africa
Diptera of Europe
Diptera of Asia
Tachinidae genera
Exoristinae